The División de Honor Femenina 2014–15 was the 58th season of women's handball top flight in Spain since its establishment. Bera Bera, retained the Championship title for a third successive season. The season began on 12 September, 2014 and the last matchday was played on 30 May, 2015. A total of 14 teams took part the league, 12 of which had already contested in the 2013–14 season, and two of which were promoted from the División de Plata 2013–14.

Bera Bera won its third title in a row. Bera Bera won the championship by a three-points margin over 2nd team in the standings, Rocasa G.C. ACE. Further, regarding to European competitions for 2014–15 season; Bera Bera qualified to EHF Cup, Rocasa ACE G.C. qualified to EHF Challenge Cup and Mecalia Atlético Guardés to EHF Cup Winners' Cup.

Promotion and relegation 
Teams promoted from 2013–14 División de Plata
KH-7 Granollers
Clínicas Rincón Málaga Costa del Sol

Teams relegated to 2015–16 División de Plata
Vivelafruta.com Castelldefels
Adesal Córdoba

Teams

Final standings

Top goalscorers

See also
Liga ASOBAL 2014–15

References

External links
Royal Spanish Handball Federation

División de Honor Femenina de Balonmano seasons
Division de Honor
2014–15 domestic handball leagues
2014 in women's handball
2015 in women's handball